Lounatic is the third studio album by Lou Bega, released in 2005. There are two versions of Lounatic: an earlier edition and a newer edition. They have slightly different track lists, each including 2 exclusive tracks, and slight mixing differences on some shared tracks. The single "Conchita" is labeled as "Mambo vs. Mozart" on the earlier track list. The album didn't chart in any official national music chart.

Track listing

Earlier Edition
 "Mambo vs. Mozart" (feat. Klazz Brothers & Cuba Percussion) - 3:43
 "Pussycat" - 3:24
 "Chocolata" - 3:24 (does not appear on new version)
 "Return of "A Little Bit" (Mambo No. 2005)" (feat. Mixmaster Erich) - 3:49
 "We Makin' Love" - 3:43
 "Get Better" - 3:47
 "I Got Style" - 3:27
 "You Wanna Be Americano" - 3:08
 "My Mama" - 3:18
 "Bachata" (feat. Alibi) - 3:22
 "Dance Like an African"  - 3:22
 "Egyptian Queen" - 3:13
 "Someday" - 3:40
 "Call Your Name" - 2:52 (does not appear on new version)
 "Thank You" - 3:17

Newer Edition
 "Conchita" (feat. Klazz Brothers & Cuba Percussion) - 3:43
 "Bachata" (feat. Alibi) - 3:24
 "Pussycat" - 3:27
 "You Wanna Be Americano" - 3:11
 "Get Better" - 3:49
 "We Makin' Love" - 3:44
 "Mrs. Monday" - 3:40 (does not appear on old version)
 "I Got Style" - 3:30
 "My Mama" - 3:19
 "What's Up (Guca Version)" - 3:25 (does not appear on old version)
 "Egyptian Queen" - 3:13
 "Dance Like an African" - 3:24
 "Someday" - 3:42
 "Thank You" - 3:18
 "Return of "A Little Bit" (Mambo No. 2005)" (feat. Mixmaster Erich) - 3:48

Credits
 Vocals: Lou Bega (main performer), Alibi, Jessica Johnson, Valerie Lecot, Mimi, Giovanna Deiana, Theresa Gold, Jenieva Jane, Solange Kassianoff, Sandrina Löcher, Nostal Phoniker, Alexia Waku
 Choir: African Male Choir, African Children's Choir
 Producer: Goar B
 Guitar: Danny Martinez, Claudio Mangione, Dax Dörsam, Pivo Deinert, Martin Kursawe, Alain Konda, Torby Leon
 Trumpet:  Claus Reichstaller, Nemanja Jovanovic
 Saxophone: Axel Kuhn
 Trombone: Gerhard Fink, Franz Schledorn, Manuel Winbeck
 Electronic keyboard: Frank Lio, Donald Fact, Juha Varpio, Torby Leon
 Bass: Ken Taylor, Kilian Forster, Christian Büttner
 Piano: Tobias Forster, Christian Büttner
 Strings: Torby Leon
 Harmonica: Christofer Kochs
 Percussion: Christian Büttner, Cuba Percussion
 Bouzouki: Mihail Amanatidis
 Beatboxing: Eliot
 Audio engineering: Christian Büttner, Jose Alvarez, Claudio Mangione, Juha Varpio, Dax Dörsam, Pivo Deinert, Wolfgang Berg, Steven Bolarinwa, Björn Friese, Frank Lio, Torby Leon, Michael Nekrasov
 Audio mixing: Christian Büttner, Spike Streefkerk
 Remixing: Mixmaster Erich
 Cover art: Peter Miller, JuPIT, Kramer, Giogoli
 Fashion advisor: Angelika M. Zwerenz

2005 albums
Lou Bega albums